Delirium is a 1972 Italian thriller film directed by Renato Polselli.

Production
The English-language dub version of the film differs greatly from the Italian version of the film.  In the Italian version, there is no mention of the Vietnam war trauma that instigates the killing spree. 
Most of the film was shot at Isarco Ravaioli's own home.

Release
Delirium was first released in 1972.
The film was released as by Empire Video with a 90-minute running time, in English with Dutch subtitles.

Reception
From retrospective reviews, Louis Paul, in his book on Italian Horror Film Directors described Delirium as one that "seems to have been entirely forgotten" and as a "savage film" that will "likely leave some viewers wondering whether it would have been to leave it that way."  Scott Aaron Stine described the film in his book The Gorehound's Guide to Splatter Films of the 1960s and 1970s, found the film "a less chaotic effort" than Black Magic Rites and "aside from the stock Vietnam war footage, the innumerable nude women in chains, and some interesting plot twists" the film was "Not a good film, but a hell of a lot more engaging than many of its peers."

References

Sources

External links
 

1972 films
1970s thriller films
Italian thriller films
Films directed by Renato Polselli
Giallo films